Chatta Bazaar (English: Hive Market), is located in Hyderabad, India. Chatta Bazar is one of the oldest bazaars in Hyderabad and was the first to organize shops under a roof for better storage of goods.

Currently Chatta Bazar is known as one of the main markets for printing invitation cards, specifically calligraphed and decorated Urdu printing. There are about 250 printing presses in the market.

See also

References

External links
 Photo published in HMDA website

Bazaars
Bazaars in India
Bazaars in Hyderabad, India
Neighbourhoods in Hyderabad, India
Shopping districts and streets in India